Dindica marginata is a moth of the family Geometridae first described by William Warren in 1894. It is found on Sulawesi in Indonesia.

References

Moths described in 1894
Pseudoterpnini